Lieutenant William Frederick Nelson Sharpe (December 6, 1892, Prescott, Ontario – February 4, 1915, Brighton, England) - pilot. Sharpe later joined the Royal Flying Corps but was killed in a flying accident. He was the first Canadian pilot to die in World War I.

Early
Frederick and Ida Bell (née Mills) Sharpe had a son, William Frederick Nelson Sharpe was born in Prescott, Ontario, on December 6, 1892. When he was a child he moved to Ottawa. As an adult, he had his flight instruction from the Curtiss Flying School in San Diego, California.

Military career 
Colonel Sam Hughes, Canada's Minister of Militia and Defence tried to create the Canadian Aviation Corps (CAC). Hughes appointed Ernest Lloyd Janney as provisional commander and authorized him to spend up to $5000 on an aircraft. A Burgess-Dunne floatplane was purchased in the United States, shipped to Vermont and then flown to Valcartier, Quebec where it was taken apart, crated, and shipped to England. Janney and the two other CAC members, William Frederick Nelson Sharpe, a pilot,  and Staff Sergeant H. A. Farr, a mechanic, accompanied the aircraft. The aircraft was left abandoned and damaged on Salisbury Plain, having never flown any combat operations. By May 1915, the CAC had dissolved.

Death
His Maurice Farman biplane (No. 731 and 70 H.P. Renault engine No. 42767, W.D. 49) crashed during a training exercise for the Royal Flying Corps near Shoreham, W Sussex.  He was the first Canadian pilot to die in World War I.

Bibliography 
Notes

References 

  
 - Total pages: 640

External Link
 Canadian military records at the Library and Archives Canada

 
Canadian Aviation Hall of Fame inductees 
Aviation history of Canada 
People from Owen Sound
Canadian people of English descent
1892 births
1915 deaths 
Persons of National Historic Significance (Canada) 
Canadian Expeditionary Force officers
Canadian aviation record holders 
Canadian Militia officers 
Canadian military personnel of World War I
Canadian military personnel from Ontario